Ľubomír Jahnátek (born 16 September 1954) is a Slovak politician for the Direction - Social Democracy. He served as Minister of Economy in Fico's First Cabinet from 2006 to 2010 and as Minister of Agriculture and Rural Development in Fico's Second Cabinet from 2012 to 2016.

Ľubomír Jahnátek was chairman of the network industry regulation office URSO since July 2017. Suspected for illegal conduct and following the proposal of the current Ministry of Economy, he was dismissed from his functions on 4 June 2020 by the newly elected government, because he did not fulfil the legal conditions required for the performance of this function when he was appointed. The office allegedly did not act independently and the work his son performs for the Nuclear Energetic Company of Slovakia is also problematic.

References

1954 births
Living people
Direction – Social Democracy politicians
Agriculture ministers of Slovakia
Economy ministers of Slovakia
Members of the National Council (Slovakia) 2010-2012
Members of the National Council (Slovakia) 2016-2020
People from the Nitra Region